Tsuchihashi (written: 土橋) is a Japanese surname. Notable people with the surname include:

, Japanese footballer
Paul Tsuchihashi (1866–1965), Japanese lexicographer
, Japanese tennis player
, Japanese general

See also
, a railway station in Toyota, Aichi Prefecture, Japan

Japanese-language surnames